Colonel Sir James Hayes Sadler  (21 May 1827 – 9 January 1910) was a British diplomat and civil servant.

Early life and education
Sadler was born to the Reverend James-Hayes Sadler (5 January 1785 – 26 August 1845) and Anne Sadler (née Rich, died 27 September 1847) in Keynsham Bury, Gloucester, England. He was educated at Eton and Oxford.

Career
In 1854 Sadler was commissioned into the Royal Sussex Militia Artillery, a newly formed part-time home defence unit of the Royal Artillery (RA). (It was retitled the 3rd Brigade, Cinque Ports Division, RA, in 1882 and Sussex Artillery (Eastern Division) RA in 1889, before becoming the Sussex Royal Garrison Artillery (Militia) in 1902.). He was promoted Lieutenant the following year and Captain in 1858. He was promoted to Honorary Major in 1874, and full Major and Honorary Lieutenant-Colonel in 1879. He resigned his commission in 1882, and was appointed Honorary Colonel of the unit.

Following his retirement from the militia, Sadler became a diplomat. Following a term as Consul in Panama, he became Consul, based at Chicago, for most of the Midwestern American States in 1887. After serving as Consul-General in Valparaiso, Chile from 1895 he was made a Knight Commander of the Order of St Michael and St George (KCMG) in the 1899 New Year Honours. He was elected a Fellow of the Royal Geographical Society in 1896 as "Hayes-Sadler."

Sadler died in 1910, and is buried in Brompton Cemetery, London.  On 17 December 1850, he had married Sophia Jane Taylor (24 September 1823 – 12 February 1902), who died on 12 February 1902, and is buried next to him. Their son, also named Sir James Hayes Sadler (1851–1922) was a colonial administrator, who also a military man and was also awarded the KCMG.

References

1827 births
1910 deaths
British Militia officers
Sussex Militia officers
Burials at Brompton Cemetery
Companions of the Order of the Bath
Knights Commander of the Order of St Michael and St George
Royal Artillery officers
Fellows of the Royal Geographical Society
People educated at Eton College
Alumni of the University of Oxford